Drew Parsons may refer to:

 Drew Parsons (musician) (born 1974), bassist for the band American Hi-Fi
 Drew Parsons (cricketer) (born 1975), Scottish cricketer

See also
Andrew Parsons (disambiguation)